Larch Way is a census-designated place (CDP) located in Snohomish County, Washington.

Demographics
The population of Larch Way was 3,318 at the 2010 Census. 1,777 people are male. 1,541 are female.

Geography
Larch Way is located at coordinates 47°50′34″N 122°15′10″W. The elevation is 505 feet.

References

Census-designated places in Snohomish County, Washington